Sharon Annette Ffolkes-Abrahams is a Jamaican attorney-at-law and politician who served as member of parliament and Minister of State in the Ministry of Industry, Investment and Commerce from 2012 to 2016.

Early life and education
Ffolkes-Abrahams is the daughter of Eugene Ffolkes and Greta Ffolkes. She received her early education at the Immaculate Conception High School in Kingston, Jamaica. She is a graduate of the University of the West Indies, Cave Hill, Barbados, where she obtained her first degree in law.

Career

Legal career
Ffolkes-Abrahams was called to the Jamaican Bar in 1981. She moved to Canada, where she qualified for the Bar at Osgoode Hall Law School and was called to the Ontario Bar on April 18, 1985. She received her Master’s degree in Administrative Law in 2003 from Osgoode Hall Law School, York University. Ffolkes-Abrahams is a trained human rights lawyer who has practiced in Ontario courts and tribunals in the areas of immigration, human rights and criminal law. She is a  former legal counsel with both the Ontario Human Rights Commission and the Advocacy Resource Centre for the Handicapped (ARCH). She is a  former member of the York Region Accessibility Advisory Committee under the Ontarians with Disabilities Act. Upon her return home to Jamaica and prior to entering representational politics, she lectured in law at the University of Technology in Montego Bay.

Political career
Ffolkes-Abrahams was first elected to the House of Representatives in 2011 from the Saint James West Central constituency, representing the People's National Party. She was Minister of State in the Ministry of Tourism in the government of prime minister Portia Simpson-Miller from 2012 to 2016.

Personal life
Ffolkes-Abrahams is married to Peter Abrahams. The couple have three children.

See also
 Women in the House of Representatives of Jamaica
 List of female Members of the House of Representatives of Jamaica

References

Year of birth unknown
Living people
20th-century Jamaican lawyers
People's National Party (Jamaica) politicians
Members of the House of Representatives of Jamaica
Women government ministers of Jamaica
Government ministers of Jamaica
21st-century Jamaican women politicians
21st-century Jamaican politicians
Year of birth missing (living people)